Günter Matthias Ziegler (born 19 May 1963) is a German mathematician who has been serving as president of the Free University of Berlin since 2018. Ziegler is known for his research in discrete mathematics and geometry, and particularly on the combinatorics of polytopes.

Biography 
Ziegler studied at the Ludwig Maximilian University of Munich from 1981 to 1984, and went on to receive his Ph.D. from the Massachusetts Institute of Technology in Cambridge, Massachusetts, in 1987, under the supervision of Anders Björner. After postdoctoral positions at the University of Augsburg and the Mittag-Leffler Institute, he received his habilitation in 1992 from the Technical University of Berlin, which he joined as a professor in 1995. Ziegler has since joined the faculty of the Free University of Berlin.

Awards and honors 
Ziegler was awarded the one million Deutschmark  by the Deutsche Forschungsgemeinschaft (DFG) in 1994 and the 1.5 million Deutschmark Gottfried Wilhelm Leibniz Prize, Germany's highest research honor, by the DFG in 2001. He was awarded the 2005 Gauss Lectureship by the German Mathematical Society. In 2006 the Mathematical Association of America awarded Ziegler and Florian Pfender its highest honor for mathematical exposition, the Chauvenet Prize, for their paper on kissing numbers.

In 2006 Ziegler became president of the German Mathematical Society for a two-year term. In 2009, the European Research Council (ERC) awarded Ziegler one of the ERC Advanced Grants in the amount of 1.85 million Euros. In 2012 he became a fellow of the American Mathematical Society. In 2013 Ziegler was granted the Hector Science Award and became a member of the Hector Fellow Academy. Since 2016 Ziegler has been chair of the Berlin Mathematical School. In 2018 he received the Leroy P. Steele Prize for Mathematical Exposition (jointly with Martin Aigner) for Proofs from THE BOOK.

Other activities
 Berlin Institute of Health (BIH), Member of the Supervisory Board (since 2020)
 German Institute for Economic Research (DIW), member of the board of trustees (since 2018)
 Genshagener Kreis, member of the board of trustees (since 2018)
 Einstein Foundation Berlin, Member of the Council
 Max Delbrück Center for Molecular Medicine in the Helmholtz Association (MDC), member of the supervisory board
 Berlin Social Science Center (WZB), member of the board of trustees (since 2018)
 Klaus Tschira Foundation, member of the board of trustees (since 2017)
 Urania, Member of the Board

Selected publications 
; 6th ed, 2018.
 .

References

Further reading
 . Article in German about Ziegler.

External links 
 
 
 
 

1963 births
Living people
20th-century German mathematicians
21st-century German mathematicians
Gottfried Wilhelm Leibniz Prize winners
Academic staff of the Free University of Berlin
Academic staff of the Technical University of Berlin
Fellows of the American Mathematical Society
Combinatorialists
Scientists from Munich
European Research Council grantees
Massachusetts Institute of Technology School of Science alumni
Mathematics popularizers
Members of the German Academy of Sciences Leopoldina
Presidents of the German Mathematical Society
Studienstiftung alumni